Cyclotridecane is an organic compound with the chemical formula C13H26.

Cycloalkanes